= PhDiA =

Architectural educational organization

PhDiA is an organization established to provide a forum for discussion of issues related to the education of doctoral students in architecture. Membership includes leading voices in academia, the profession and doctoral students. PhDiA also sponsors a peer-reviewed journal and supports regular conferences.

== Mission ==
PhDiA was created to:

- Establish a clearinghouse for doctoral program pedagogy and structure
- Assist faculty and administrators in doctoral programs
- Provide a forum for doctoral students
- Encourage inter-university doctoral research and dissertation cooperation
- Elevate doctoral studies and the role of research and advanced scholarship
- Recognize outstanding achievements and leadership in doctoral research
